Rhoticism is a word occasionally encountered when one of the following is intended:

Rhotacism (speech impediment), difficulty in pronouncing the /r/ sound
Rhotacism (sound change), the historical sound change of another sound to /r/
Rhotacization, the articulation used to produce an r-colored vowel
Rhoticity:
 the property of a rhotic consonant
 the property that distinguishes rhotic and non-rhotic accents